George Rudolph Volkert CBE FRAeS (4 July 1891 – 16 May 1978) was a British aircraft designer.

Early life 
He was born in Fulham. He studied at the Northampton Institute in London (now City University London).

Career

Handley Page 
He joined Handley Page in 1912, becoming head of the design department, when only 21. He went to Japan in 1921 as part of the British Aviation Mission. In 1923 he became Chief Designer of Handley Page. Handley Page had its design department at Woodley, Berkshire.

The Handley Page Hampden was designed in 1933, and first flew on 21 July 1936. It entered service with 49 Sqn in September 1938.

The Handley Page Halifax, of which he was responsible for the design, first flew on 25 October 1939. In early 1944, 1,200 Halifaxes were produced in six months. Two-fifths of Britain's heavy bombers in World War II were Halifaxes. It entered service with 35 Sqn on 23 November 1940 at RAF Linton-on-Ouse, carrying out its first night-raid on 11 March 1942 over Le Havre. Most of the Halifaxes flown from England were with the RCAF in North Yorkshire as No. 6 Group RCAF.

Personal life 
He married Violet Elizabeth Haley, of Hurlingham, on 21 July 1928 in Isleworth, in Brentford).; at the time he lived in Grove Park, Hounslow. They had a son Alan Charles (born in 1937) and a daughter Jane (born in 1938). His wife died in February 1990 in Uckfield. He has two surviving granddaughters Louise (1971) and Rosalie (1972) Louise has 4 children: Francis, Christa, Charlotte and Caspar Chapman

See also 
 Roy Chadwick and Stuart Davies (engineer), responsible for the Avro Lancaster (an updated Avro Manchester)
 Claude Lipscomb (CPT Lipscombe), designer of the Short Stirling

References

External links 
 Halifax bomber production

1891 births
1978 deaths
Alumni of City, University of London
Commanders of the Order of the British Empire
English aerospace engineers
Fellows of the Royal Aeronautical Society
Handley Page
People from Fulham